Franklin Township is one of the twelve townships of Jackson County, Ohio, United States.  As of the 2010 census, 2,129 people lived in the township.

Geography
Located in the southern part of the county, it borders the following townships:
Lick Township: north
Bloomfield Township: east
Madison Township: southeast
Jefferson Township: south
Hamilton Township: southwest corner
Scioto Township: west
Liberty Township: northwest corner

Of the three Jackson County townships that do not border other counties (Franklin, Lick, and Coal), Franklin Township is the farthest south.

A small part of the city of Jackson, the county seat of Jackson County, lies in northern Franklin Township.

Name and history
Franklin Township was organized as an original township of Jackson County, and named for Benjamin Franklin. It is one of twenty-one Franklin Townships statewide.

Government
The township is governed by a three-member board of trustees, who are elected in November of odd-numbered years to a four-year term beginning on the following January 1. Two are elected in the year after the presidential election and one is elected in the year before it. There is also an elected township fiscal officer, who serves a four-year term beginning on April 1 of the year after the election, which is held in November of the year before the presidential election. Vacancies in the fiscal officership or on the board of trustees are filled by the remaining trustees.

References

External links

Townships in Jackson County, Ohio
Townships in Ohio